Jean Bouhier may refer to:
Jean Bouhier (bishop) (1666–1744), first bishop of Dijon
Jean Bouhier (jurist) (1673–1746),  to the Parlement de Bourgogne and writer